"Southern Rains" is a song written by Roger Murrah, and recorded by American country music artist Mel Tillis.  It was released in December 1980 as first single and title track from the album Southern Rains.  The song was Tillis' sixth number one on the country chart.  The single stayed at number one for one week and spent a total of eleven weeks on the country chart.

Charts

References
 

Mel Tillis songs
1980 singles
Songs written by Roger Murrah
Song recordings produced by Jimmy Bowen
Elektra Records singles
1980 songs